The varied solitaire (Myadestes coloratus) is a species of bird in the family Turdidae. It is found in Colombia and Panama. Its natural habitat is subtropical or tropical moist montane forests.

References

varied solitaire
Birds of Colombia
Birds of Panama
varied solitaire
Taxonomy articles created by Polbot